Dodewaard is a village in the Dutch province of Gelderland. It is a part of the municipality of Neder-Betuwe, and lies about 7 km south of Wageningen.

Dodewaard was a separate municipality until 2002, when it became a part of Kesteren. Before 1818, the municipality was called "Hien en Dodewaard".

It also houses the now defunct Dodewaard nuclear power plant.

History 
It was first mentioned in the 11th century de Dodeuuero, and means "land near water of Dudo/Dodo (person)". Dodewaard developed along the Waal River as a stretched out settlement. The Dutch Reformed Church dates from around 1100. The tower was enlarged in the 12th and 16th century and replaced between 1840 and 1842. In 1840, it was home to 714 people.

The Dodewaard nuclear power plant was in service from 1969 until 1997. Most of the complex has been demolished, however the core remains and will not be dismantled until 2045 when the radio activity has been substantially reduced.

Notable people 
 Renger van der Zande (born 1986), race-car driver

Gallery

References

Municipalities of the Netherlands disestablished in 2002
Populated places in Gelderland
Former municipalities of Gelderland
Neder-Betuwe